Zombies is a 2016 action horror film written and directed by Hamid Torabpour and starring Tony Todd, Steven Luke and Raina Hein.

The film was released in selected theaters on October 21, 2016 and on digitally on September 29, 2017.

Plot
When a deadly virus decimates Earth, a man and other survivors must utilize weapons to battle rampaging, bloodthirsty zombies.

Cast
 Tony Todd as Detective Sommers 
 Steven Luke as Luke 
 Raina Hein as Bena 
 Amanda Day as Tala  
 Aaron Courteau as Marcus  
 Marcus Dee as Dave  
 Heidi Fellner as Haley
 Todd Vance as Dad  
 Jim Westcott as Beaker  
 Amber Rhodes as Lily 
 Brian Thoe as Shrimp Scampi  
 Bruce Miller as Porch Man 
 Cameron Cylkowski as Aaron  
 Aundrea Smith as Little Girl  
 Cody Fleury as Zombie on Stairs 
 Lucas Youngerberger as Listening Survivor

References

External links
 
 

2016 action thriller films
2016 films
2016 horror films
American post-apocalyptic films
American horror thriller films
American zombie films
2010s English-language films
2010s American films